Surindar Kumar Trehan (S.K. Trehan) was an Indian mathematician who specialised in non-linear stability in magnetohydrodynamics.

He was awarded in 1976 the Shanti Swarup Bhatnagar Prize for Science and Technology, the highest science award in India,  in the mathematical sciences category. Prof. Trehan has done significant work on stability of force-free magnetic fields, stability of
jets and cylinders and stability of inhomogeneous plasmas. His work on the mathematical treatment of gaseous polytropes in the presence of a magnetic field is a breakthrough in this  area. He has also done important work on hydromagnetic waves and rotating gaseous
masses.

Short Biography 

Please note that the authorization of this article belongs to www.insaindia.res only.

Reference : 

https://www.insaindia.res.in/detail.php?id=N76-0843

References
2. ^ Gathered information from 

https://www.insaindia.res.in/detail.php?id=N76-0843

External links
S. K. Trehan (1931–2004), Current Science, 25 January 2005
Indian National Science Academy
Indian National Science Academy database

1931 births
2004 deaths
20th-century Indian mathematicians
Recipients of the Shanti Swarup Bhatnagar Award in Mathematical Science